Magellan Midstream Partners is a publicly traded partnership based in Tulsa, Oklahoma. It owns ammonia and petroleum pipelines in the Mid-Continent oil province. According to the United States Department of State, it owns "83 petroleum products terminals, more than 9,000 miles of refined products pipeline, 800 miles of crude oil pipeline and a 1,100-mile ammonia pipeline system." It is listed on the New York Stock Exchange. Company executives, including its CEO Michael Mears, rang the NYSE closing bell on February 8, 2016.

References

Companies listed on the New York Stock Exchange
Companies based in Tulsa, Oklahoma
Oil companies of the United States
Energy companies of the United States
Natural gas companies of the United States
Natural gas pipeline companies
Petroleum in Oklahoma